Rodrigo Gerardo de Jesús Arias Sánchez (born 26 July 1946) is a Costa Rican lawyer and politician who has been President of the Legislative Assembly of Costa Rica since 2022. He also served as Minister of the Presidency during the two governments of his brother, Óscar Arias Sánchez, from 1986 to 1990 and 2006 to 2010.

Early life and education 
Sánchez was born in Heredia on 26 July 1946, the second child after Óscar Arias, of Juan Rafael Arias Trejos and Lylliam Sánchez Cortés. 

Sánchez graduated from the University of Costa Rica with a Bachelor of Laws in 1969 before earning a Master of Laws from the University of Pennsylvania in 1971.

Political career 
Sánchez was elected municipal councilor of Heredia for the four-year term 1974–1978. He achieved this victory even though he had not always been a member of the ranks of the National Liberation Party – as his brother Óscar Arias – because as a young man he sympathized with the presidential candidacy of José Joaquín Trejos, of the National Unification Party, who ruled from 1966 to 1970.

After being Advisor to the President of the Republic, Sánchez was appointed as Minister of the Presidency during the two governments of his brother, Óscar Arias Sánchez, from 1986 to 1990 and 2006 to 2010. During his tenures as Minister, Sánchez played an important role as a government spokesman and in favor of CAFTA implementation laws. In March 2009, Rodrigo Arias Sánchez declared himself in favor of a constitutional reform.

Following the general elections, on 1 May 2022, Sánchez was elected President of the Legislative Assembly of Costa Rica with 50 votes in favour.

References 

Living people
1946 births
National Liberation Party (Costa Rica) politicians
Presidents of the Legislative Assembly of Costa Rica
20th-century Costa Rican politicians
21st-century Costa Rican politicians
University of Costa Rica alumni
University of Pennsylvania Law School alumni
20th-century Costa Rican lawyers
People from Heredia (canton)